The GAA Hurling All-Ireland Senior Club Championship, known simply as the All-Ireland Club Championship, is an annual inter-county hurling competition organised by the Gaelic Athletic Association (GAA). It is the highest inter-county club hurling competition in Ireland, and has been contested every year since the 1970-71 championship (except for 2020-2021, due to the COVID-19 pandemic).

The final, currently held on the third Sunday in January, is the culmination of a series of games played between October and February with the winners receiving the Tommy Moore Cup. The All-Ireland Championship has always been played on a straight knockout basis whereby once a team loses they are eliminated from the championship. Currently qualification is limited to teams competing in the Galway Championship, the Leinster Championship, the Munster Championship and the Ulster Championship.

Four teams currently participate in the All-Ireland semi-finals. The most successful teams are from Galway – seven Galway clubs have won the All-Ireland title on 13 separate occasions.

The title has been won by 26 clubs, 10 of whom have won the title more than once. The current holders and all-time record-holders are Ballyhale Shamrocks, who have won the championship on 9 occasions.

History

Beginnings

Since the foundation of the Gaelic Athletic Association in 1884, challenge, exhibition and tournament matches between clubs on an inter-county level were commonplace. Throughout the 1930s and 1940s, Glen Rovers of Cork and Ahane of Limerick regularly clashed in off-season games. In the 1950s the Cork Churches Tournament came to be recognised as the unofficial All-Ireland Club Championship. The tournament was an initiative by the then Bishop of Cork and Ross, Cornelius Lucey, to raise money to build five new churches in the fast developing suburbs of Cork. Participation was by invitation and was extended to the country’s current best hurling teams. This tournament lasted for five years, however, by the 1960s there was a growing appetite for a similar competition. In 1965 the Munster Council organised the Munster Senior Club Hurling Championship. Following the success of this provincial championship, Donegal, Galway and Wexford put down a motion for the introduction of All-Ireland club championships in both codes at the GAA's Congress in 1969. The motion was successful and the competition eventually began in 1970-71.

Team dominance

The difficult nature of qualifying for the All-Ireland Championship via the individual county and provincial championships has meant that individual clubs have rarely dominated for prolonged periods of time, however, there have been exceptions.

The first decade of the All-Ireland Championship was dominated by the “big three” clubs from Cork, with Blackrock, Glen Rovers and St. Finbarr’s, Togher sharing every All-Ireland title bar one between 1972 and 1979. Blackrock became the preeminent team of the championship by winning three All-Ireland titles from four final appearances during this time. Glen Rovers and St. Finbarr’s claimed two titles apiece during the same period.

The second decade saw a greater spread of counties represented, with the club champions of Antrim, Cork, Galway, Kilkenny, Tipperary and Wexford all claiming the All-Ireland title. Kilkenny clubs were dominant by winning five championship titles between 1981 and 1991. Ballyhale Shamrocks won three of these titles with victories in 1981, 1984 and 1990.

The resurgence of non-traditional teams at inter-county level was also prevalent in the club championship during the 1990s. Galway clubs came to the fore during this decade, with Sarsfields becoming the first team to retain the All-Ireland title with back-to-back wins in 1993-94. Their success was followed by Athenry who won a lone title in 1997 before claiming back-to-back championships in 2000-01. Clare clubs, buoyed by the inter-county success of the county team, claimed All-Ireland titles in 1996 and 1999.

Offaly club Birr became the most dominant team at the turn of the century. Between 1995 and 2003 the club became the first to win four All-Ireland titles, however, this record was bettered by Ballyhale Shamrocks who won a record-breaking fifth championship in 2010. Portumna of Galway dominated the new century by winning four All-Ireland titles between 2006 and 2014.

Competition format history
The All-Ireland Championship has always been played as a single elimination tournament whereby once a team loses they are eliminated from the championship. Participation is open to the four champion clubs of the four provinces of Ireland and has largely remained the same since the inaugural championship in 1971, however, there have been some minor changes throughout.

In 1976 the All-Ireland Championship was extended to five clubs as the winners of the London Senior Hurling Championship were allowed to enter. They entered the All-Ireland series at the newly-created quarter-final stage and played one of the four provincial champions in rotation. This system lasted until 2004. Since then the London champions have contested the All-Ireland Intermediate Club Hurling Championship.

After several years of being regarded as the most uncompetitive of the four provincial championships, the Connacht Championship was discontinued in 2009. This has meant that the Galway champions represent the province unopposed and gain automatic entry to the All-Ireland semi-final stage.

Qualification
The GAA All-Ireland Senior Club Hurling Championship features four teams in the final tournament. The champions of Leinster, Munster and Ulster and the Galway champions (a team who are unopposed in their own province) qualify for the All-Ireland semi-finals.

Structure
Each of Ireland's 32 counties play their own championship between all the hurling clubs in the county – depending on the county, it can be league, knockout, or a mixture of both. The 32 county champions play in the 4 provincial championships, with the four winners of these advancing to the All-Ireland Semi-Finals. Until the introduction of the Intermediate and Junior Championships one team usually played the London champions in a quarter-final. The London champions now play in the Intermediate Championship. The All-Ireland Final is played in Croke Park on St. Patrick's Day.

Schedule:
County championships: June — November
Provincial championships: October — December
All-Ireland quarter-final and semi-finals: February
All-Ireland Final: March 17

Winning managers
Managers in the All-Ireland Club Championship are involved in the day-to-day running of the team, including the training, team selection, and sourcing of players. Their influence varies from club-to-club and is related to the individual club committees. The manager is assisted by a team of two or three selectors and a backroom team consisting of various coaches.

Provincial and All-Ireland champions by year
All-Ireland winners are shaded in gold, and counties are listed in brackets.

List of finals

Roll of honour

By club

By county

By province

Top scorers

All time

Cumulative finals

Single Final

Records and statistics

Finals

Teams
Most Wins: 9
 Ballyhale Shamrocks: (1981, 1984, 1990, 2007, 2010, 2015, 2019, 2020, 2023)
Most Consecutive Wins: 2
 Sarsfields (1993, 1994)
 Athenry (2000, 2001)
 Ballyhale Shamrocks (2019, 2020)
 Birr (2002, 2003)
 Cuala (2017, 2018)
 Portumna (2008, 2009)
Most Final Appearances: 11
 Ballyhale Shamrocks (1979, 1981, 1984, 1990, 2007, 2010, 2015, 2019, 2020, 2022, 2023)
Most Final Appearances Without Winning: 5
 St. Anne's, Rathnure (1972, 1974, 1978, 1987, 1999)
 Dunloy (1995, 1996, 2004, 2005, 2023)
Most Final Appearances Without Losing: 8
 Ballyhale Shamrocks (1981, 1984, 1990, 2007, 2010, 2015, 2019, 2020)

Teams

By decade
Most Successful Team of Each Decade:
 1970s: Three titles for  Blackrock (1972, 1974, 1979)
 1980s: Two titles for  Ballyhale Shamrocks (1981, 1984)
 1990s: Two titles each for   Birr (1995, 1998), and  Sarsfields (1993, 1994)
 2000s: Three titles for  Portumna (2006, 2008, 2009)
 2010s: Three titles for  Ballyhale Shamrocks (2010, 2015, 2019)
 2020s: Two titles for  Ballyhale Shamrocks (2020, 2023)

Longest gaps
Longest Gaps Between Successive Titles:
 29 years:  Loughgiel Shamrocks (1983-2012)
 23 years:  James Stephens (1982-2005)
 17 years:  Ballyhale Shamrocks (1990-2007)

Clubs

See also
 All-Ireland Intermediate Club Hurling Championship
 All-Ireland Junior Club Hurling Championship
 All-Ireland Senior Club Camogie Championship
 All-Ireland Junior B Club Hurling Championship
 All-Ireland Senior Club Football Championship

References

External links

 "Flashback: some St Patrick's Day Club SHC finals that will never be forgotten", Hogan Stand, 17 March 2021

 
Senior